Detachment Brandenstein was a unit commanded by German Baron Otto von Brandenstein. The 3,000 man unit which fought in the Finnish Civil War by landing at Loviisa April 7, 1918. Its assigned mission was to cut the Reds' railway connections by attacking to the East, thus cutting the railway between Helsinki and Viipuri. The major operation for Detachment Brandenstein was the Battle of Lahti in 19 April – 1 May.

Later the unit was attached to the Baltic Sea Division.

References 
Arimo, Reino (1995): Saksalaisten sotilaallinen toiminta Suomessa 1918 .
 

Military units and formations of Germany in World War I
Finnish Civil War